The 2014–15 The Citadel Bulldogs basketball team represented The Citadel, The Military College of South Carolina in the 2014–15 NCAA Division I men's basketball season.  The Bulldogs were led by fifth year head coach Chuck Driesell and played their home games at McAlister Field House. They played a member of the Southern Conference, as they have since 1936–37. They finished the season 11–19, 6–12 in SoCon play to finish in a three-way tie for seventh place. They lost in the first round of the SoCon tournament to Furman.  Driesell was not retained after the season.

Preseason

Departures
Four players from the 2013–14 team departed the program prior to the season.

Recruiting

Outlook
The Bulldogs were picked to finish 9th by the Coaches and 10th by the SoCon Media in the ten team Southern Conference.  Ashton Moore was named to the preseason All Conference team.

Roster
Freshman Nadi Beciri left the team due to personal reasons on November 14, 2014.

Schedule
The Bulldogs again opened the season with the All-Military Classic, facing archrival VMI in the opener.  Army hosted the rotating tournament.  Navy visited McAlister Field House on December 6, 2014.  The Bulldogs traveled  to Florida State, Virginia Tech, and Michigan State.  Weeknight home games began at 6:00 p.m. in order to facilitate cadet attendance.

|-
! colspan=8 style=""|Regular season

|-
! colspan=8 style=""|

References

The Citadel Bulldogs basketball seasons
Citadel
Citadel
Citadel